Florence, Lady Baker, or Florence Barbara Marie Finnian: or Florica Maria Sas; or Maria Freiin von Sas; or Barbara Maria Szász (6 August 1841 – 11 March 1916) was a Hungarian-born British explorer. Born in Transylvania (then in the Kingdom of Hungary), she became an orphan when her parents and brother were murdered by the Romanian marauders led by Ioan Axente Sever and Simion Prodan who killed approximately 1000 predominantly Hungarian civilians in Nagyenyed on 8–9 January, 1849. She fled with the remains of the Hungarian army to the Ottoman Empire, to Vidin. Here she disappeared as child only to be seen in 1859 by Samuel Baker who rescued her. While Baker was visiting the Duke of Atholl on his shooting estate in Scotland, he befriended Maharaja Duleep Singh and in 1858–1859, the two partnered an extensive hunting trip in central Europe and the Balkans, via Frankfurt, Berlin, Vienna and Budapest. On the last part of the voyage, Baker and the Maharajah hired a wooden boat in Budapest, which was eventually abandoned on the frozen Danube. The two continued into Vidin where, to amuse the Maharajah, Baker went to the Vidin slave market. There, Baker fell in love with a white slave girl, Florence, destined for the Ottoman Pasha of Vidin. He was outbid by the Pasha but bribed the girl's attendants and they ran away in a carriage together and eventually she became his lover and wife and accompanied him everywhere he journeyed. They are reported to have married, most probably in Bucharest, before going to Dubrushka, but Sir Samuel certainly promised that they would go through another ceremony on their return to England – where they had a family wedding in 1865.

Together they went in search of the source of the River Nile and found Lake Albert. They journeyed to Samuel Baker's home in England where they were married and she became Lady Baker. She later returned to Africa with her husband to try and put down the slave trade. They both retired and died in Devon.

Early life
Some sources say that Florence Baker began life in 1841 in Nagyenyed, Hungary (today Aiud, Romania) as Barbara Maria von Sas. The story handed down in the Baker family is that she was the daughter of a Székely officer from a Hungarian noble family, who had estates in Transylvania, called von Sas (a branch of the von Sass family) and whilst she was young, during the Hungarian Revolution of 1848 "her father and brothers had been killed before her eyes". As an adolescent, she spoke Hungarian, German, Romanian, and Turkish. She may have been fourteen when she was being sold as a slave in Vidin, a town and fortified port on the River Danube in what was then the Ottoman Empire and is now in Bulgaria, in January 1859. According to certain accounts, she was destined to be owned by the Pasha of Vidin, but she had been spotted by Samuel Baker. He and Maharaja Duleep Singh were both on a hunting trip. Samuel Baker bribed the guards and Florence was allowed to escape into his ownership.

Africa

Samuel Baker took her to Africa where he was leading an expedition to find the source of the River Nile. They travelled up the Nile to Gondokoro in present-day South Sudan where Florence saved the expedition. There was a dispute between her husband's inflexibility and the staff's disloyalty. Florence was able to intercede and find some common agreement. Gondokoro was a base for ivory and slaves, and the point where boats could go no further and where they would need to travel to the source on foot. There they met Speke and Grant who told them of their explorations. They suggested that they investigate another branch of the Nile. When Speke and Grant both later wrote down accounts of their voyages neither of them mentioned that Baker had Florence with him. This was in line with an agreement they made with Samuel Baker.

Florence and Samuel Baker discovered Murchison Falls and Lake Albert in what is now Uganda.

Arriving in England, they lived at Hedenham Hall in Norfolk. 

They were married on 4 November 1865 at St James's Church, Piccadilly, when Florence’s name was given as Florence Barbara Marie Finnian and the name of her father as "Matthew Finnian, Gentleman decd."

When Samuel Baker was knighted she became Lady Baker. The details of how they met was meant to be kept secret but the story circulated and this resulted in Queen Victoria deciding to exclude Baker from court.

In 1869 Samuel was invited by Isma'il Pasha, the Turkish Viceroy of Egypt, to return to Africa to help eliminate or reduce the trade in slaves around Gondokoro. Samuel was made Governor General of the Equatorial Nile. Accepting the invitation, they returned to Africa where they attempted to gain the upper hand. Florence served as the medic and when they were defeated at Bunyoro she was there carrying rifles and brandy in addition to two umbrellas and a pistol.

Later life

In 1873 she and her husband started living at their house, Sandford Orleigh, at Newton Abbot in Devon. General Gordon arrived in February 1883 and requested that Samuel assist him in evacuating people from the besieged Khartoum during the Mahdist War in Egypt. Florence would be required on such a journey. However, Florence would not go back to Africa and her husband would not travel without her. Sir Samuel Baker died in 1893. 

In the 1901 United Kingdom census, Florence B. M. Baker was still living at Sandford, Orleigh, Highweek, and her age was stated as 58, her place of birth as Hungary. She was living with Ethel L. Baker, a 46-year-old step-daughter and eight servants, including a cook and a footman. 

Florence Baker died in Devon and was buried with the remains of her husband.

Legacy

Together with Delia Akeley, Christina Dodwell, Mary Kingsley and Alexine Tinne, she was one of the five subjects chosen for a 1997 book on women explorers in Africa.

A memorial plaque commemorating her travels was unveiled by László Kövér, Speaker of the Hungarian National Assembly on 4 March 2019, on the 155th anniversary of her trip to search for the source of the Nile. The memorial plaque is on the shore of the Nile, in the Murchison Falls National Park in Uganda.

References

External links

1841 births
1916 deaths
People from Aiud
Slaves from the Ottoman Empire
Female explorers
Explorers of Africa
Hungarian explorers
Hungarian nobility
Székely people
Emigrants from the Ottoman Empire to the United Kingdom
19th-century slaves